The Philippine Lawn Bowls Association is the national governing body for lawn bowls in the Philippines. It  is accredited by the Professional Bowls Association which is the governing body for the sport of lawn bowls in the world.

External links
Philippine Lawn Bowls Association profile at the Philippine Olympic Committee website

Philippines
Lawn bowls in the Philippines
Lawn Bowls
Bowling organizations